Robert Millar may refer to:

Robert Millar, now Philippa York (born 1958), Scottish cyclist
Robert Millar (marketer) (1877–1960), Irish–Norwegian marketer
Robert Millar (soccer) (1890–1967), soccer player and coach
Robert G. Millar (1925–2001),  Christian Identity leader
Robert McColl Millar (born 1956), Scottish linguist
Robbie Millar (1967–2005), chef and restaurateur
Robert Millar (born 1950), former drummer for English rock band Supertramp
Robert "Bob" Millar, former guitarist and vocalist for Australian rock band The Deakins

See also
Robert Miller (disambiguation)